Lara M. Brown is an American political scientist and the director of the Graduate School of Political Management at George Washington University since 2016.

Early life and education 
Brown was born and grew up in California. She obtained a BA, MA and PhD in political sciences from the University of California, Los Angeles. Subsequently she also obtained an MA in American politics and public policy from the University of Arizona.

Career 
Brown started her career in academics and eventually served as an assistant professor at Villanova University. She then served as an education policy and public affairs consultant in Silicon Valley and Los Angeles for some time and later returned into academics, also serving in the Department of Education in President Bill Clinton's administration.

George Washington University 
In 2013, Brown joined the Graduate School of Political Management as an associate professor and director for the Political Management Program. In 2016, she was appointed as interim director of the Graduate School of Political Management, then, in 2017, named as its new director.

Miscellaneous 

Brown is considered an expert in presidential campaigns and elections and thus frequently featured in different media, commenting on and writing about politics, elections and governance. She has written blog posts for The New York Times, Politico, The Hill, The Huffington Post and regularly contributes to U.S. News & World Report'''s Thomas Jefferson Street blog.

Brown served on the board of directors of The New Agenda, an organization focused on advancing women rights.

 Works 
Brown is a distinguished author and dedicated scholar and has authored, co-authored, edited and contributed to a variety of books and scientific publications.

 Books 

 Jockeying for the American Presidency: The Political Opportunism of Aspirants (Cambria, 2010)
 The Presidential Leadership Dilemma: Between the Constitution and a Political Party'', Julia R. Azari, Lara M. Brown, and Zim G. Nwokora, eds., (SUNY, 2013)

Personal life 
Brown is married to Major Garrett. The couple live in Washington, D.C.

References

External links 
Public bio

The Graduate School of Political Management faculty
Year of birth missing (living people)
Living people
Villanova University faculty
University of California, Los Angeles alumni
American women political scientists
American political scientists
University of Arizona alumni